Yunost Sport Palace is an indoor sporting arena located in Chelyabinsk, Russia. The capacity of the arena is 3,500. It was built in 1967 and served as the home arena for the ice hockey team Traktor Chelyabinsk until 2009, at which time the team moved to the newly constructed Traktor Sport Palace.

Starting with the 2012–13 season, Yunost Sport Palace has been the home arena of Supreme Hockey League (VHL) team Chelmet Chelyabinsk. Three sports schools utilize the arena‘s facilities: MBU SSHOR Todes, a primary and secondary school specializing in figure skating; the Sergei Makarov School (named after Sergei Makarov), which specializes in ice hockey; and Veronika Dance School, a secondary school specializing in dancesport.

References

External links
Official website 

Indoor ice hockey venues in Russia
Indoor arenas in Russia
Sport in Chelyabinsk
Traktor Chelyabinsk
Buildings and structures in Chelyabinsk Oblast
Belye Medveditsy